"E Ola Ke Alii Ke Akua", translated as God Save the King, was one of the four national anthems of the Hawaiian Kingdom. It was composed in 1860 by then 25-year-old Prince William Charles Lunalilo, who later became King Lunalilo. Prior to 1860, Hawai‘i lacked its own national anthem and had used the British royal anthem God Save The King. A contest was sponsored in 1860 by Kamehameha IV, who wanted a song with Hawaiian lyrics set to the tune of the British anthem. The winning entry was written by Lunalilo and was reputed to have been written in 20 minutes. Lunalilo was awarded 10 dollars which he later donated to the Queen's Hospital. His composition became Hawaii's first national anthem. It remained Hawaii's national anthem for 6 years until 1866, when it was replaced by Queen Liliuokalani's composition He Mele Lāhui Hawaii .

E Ola Ke Aliʻi Ke Akua

References

Symbols of Hawaii
Historical national anthems
Hawaiian songs
Royal anthems
Oceanian anthems
1860 establishments in Hawaii
National anthem compositions in G major
God Save the King